Andrew Franks (born January 11, 1993) is a former American football placekicker. He was signed by the Miami Dolphins as an undrafted free agent in 2015. He played college football at Rensselaer Polytechnic Institute (RPI), where he received a bachelor's degree in biomedical engineering.

College career
Franks attended Rensselaer Polytechnic Institute (RPI), a Division III school, from 2011 to 2014. He was twice named first-team All-American by D3football.com, one of two All-America teams recognized in the NCAA record book.

Professional career 
In May 2015, the Miami Dolphins signed Franks as an undrafted free agent to compete along with Caleb Sturgis.  On September 5, 2015, Franks won the job, after Sturgis was released.

At the end of the 2015 season, Franks had converted 81.2% of his field goals (13-of-16) and kicked 33 PATs.

Franks remained the Dolphins' kicker during the 2016 season. During Week 14, Franks made his first game-winning field goal, kicking a 21-yard field goal to win the game 26-23 over the Arizona Cardinals with 1 second remaining on the clock.

In Week 16, he hit his career high field goal from 55 yards against the Buffalo Bills on December 24, 2016 to tie the game at 31-31 with 10 seconds remaining. Franks later kicked a 27-yard field goal late in overtime to win the game.

On September 3, 2017, Franks was waived by the Dolphins.

In October 2019, Franks was picked up by the XFL's Tampa Bay Vipers in the open phase of the 2020 XFL Draft. He had his contract terminated when the league suspended operations on April 10, 2020.

References

External links
Dolphins bio
Rotoworld profile
RPI bio

1993 births
Living people
American football placekickers
Miami Dolphins players
People from Carmel-by-the-Sea, California
Players of American football from California
RPI Engineers football players
Orlando Apollos players
Tampa Bay Vipers players